The 2013 GCC Futsal Cup was the  first edition of the biennial Futsal competition. It took place in Qatar in 2013. The competition was originally scheduled to be hosted in the city of Bahrain, but was moved to Bahrain in October 2012 to ensure that they could suitably host the competition in the 2 edition.

Tournament

The five teams in the tournament played a single round-robin style competition. The team achieving first place in the overall standings was the tournament winner.

Result 
https://www.goalzz.com/main.aspx?c=9302&stage=1&sch=true

Tuesday 24 September 2013
	United Arab Emirates	4 : 6	Bahrain	Round # 1
	
	Qatar	3 : 3	Saudi Arabia	Round # 1
	
Wednesday 25 September 2013
	Kuwait	8 : 5	Bahrain	Round # 2
	
	Saudi Arabia	5 : 3	United Arab Emirates	Round # 2
	
Friday 27 September 2013
	Kuwait	4 : 1	Saudi Arabia	Round # 3
	
	Qatar	8 : 1	United Arab Emirates	Round # 3
	
Saturday 28 September 2013
	Kuwait	6 : 2	United Arab Emirates	Round # 4
	
	Qatar	2 : 4	Bahrain	Round # 4
	
Monday 30 September 2013
	Bahrain	3 : 6	Saudi Arabia	Round # 5
	
	Qatar	1 : 5	Kuwait	Round # 5

References

2013
2013
2013 in Asian futsal
2012–13 in Saudi Arabian football
2012–13 in Bahraini football
2012–13 in Kuwaiti football
2012–13 in Qatari football
2012–13 in Emirati football
2013